Emmer is a low-yielding, awned wheat. 

Emmer may also refer to:

 Frank Emmer (1896 - 1963), an American baseball player and the shortstop for the Cincinnati Reds
 Huib Emmer (born 1951), a Dutch composer
 Luciano Emmer (1918 – 2009), an Italian film director
 Tom Emmer (born 1961), a United States Representative from Minnesota 
 Emmer, a Dutch word for bucket
 Emmer (Weser), a river of Lower Saxony and North Rhine-Westphalia, Germany